Wadi El Natrun (Arabic:  "Valley of Natron"; Coptic:  , "measure of the hearts") is a depression in northern Egypt that is located  below sea level and  below the Nile River level. The valley contains several alkaline lakes, natron-rich salt deposits, salt marshes and freshwater marshes.

In Christian literature it is usually known as Scetis (  in Hellenistic Greek) or  Skete (plural  in ecclesiastical Greek). 
It is one of the three early Christian monastic centers located in the Nitrian Desert of the northwestern Nile Delta. The other two monastic centers are Nitria and Kellia. Scetis, now called Wadi El Natrun, is best known today because its ancient monasteries remain in use, unlike Nitria and Kellia which have only archaeological remains. The desertified valley around Scetis in particular may be called the Desert of Scetis.

Fossil discoveries
The area is one of the best known sites containing large numbers of fossils of large pre-historic animals in Egypt, and was known for this in the first century AD and probably much earlier.

Geography

Wadi al-Natrun is the common name for a desert valley located west of the Nile Delta, along the El Tahrir markaz, which is about 10 km west of the entrance to Sadat City on the Cairo-Alexandria Desert Road, and about 50 km from Khattabah on the Nile (Rashid Branch), and it falls below the level of the plateau surface surrounding it about 50 meters. The length of this depression ranges between 5, 55 and 60 km, while its average width is 10 km, and its deepest point reaches 24 meters below sea level. The depression is the smallest depression in the Egyptian Western Desert, with an area of about 500 km2. Therefore, it is true that it is a depression and not a valley, because the region is a closed depression that has a beginning and an end, and it has no source, estuary or tributaries, so the launch of the word "Wadi" on the depression is not topographically correct.

The Wadi contains 12 lakes, the total surface area of which is 10 km square and their average depth is only 2 m. The color of these lakes is reddish blue because its water is saturated with the Natron salt.

History

Ancient history

Natron valley is first attested in the story of the Eloquent Peasant, and it is mentioned among the list of seven oases in the Temple of Edfu. In Ptolemaic times it constituted part of the Nitrite nome. It was also known in Coptic as Mountain of Salt or Phanihosem.

The importance of the Natrun valley dates back to the Pharaonic era, as the ancient Egyptian and the Libyans fought there many battles. And this ended up with the Egyptians overcoming them and annexed the eastern side of the desert, which still belongs to Egypt. Then, Wadi al-Natrun became an administrative part of the country in the Pharaonic era, but there is no information about its history during their reign, and the latest writings on the wars between the libu and the Egyptians indicate that the last of them was in 1170 BC during the reign of Ramesses III.

As for the religious significance of Wadi al-Natrun, there are many discoveries that indicate that this area was considered sacred as early as year 2000 BC at the very least. Among these discoveries is a bust of black granite dating back to the era of the Seventeenth Dynasty of the Pharaohs, and there is also a granite gate and stones from the lintel of a door bearing cartridges for King Amenemhat I, in a place called the backbone.

Economic history
The alkali lakes of the Natron Valley provided the Ancient Egyptians with the sodium bicarbonate used in mummification and in Egyptian faience, and later by the Romans as a flux for glass making.

The Egyptian Salt and Soda Company Railway was built at the end of the 19th century as a 33 miles (54 km) long narrow gauge railway with a gauge of 750 mm, which attracted the first tourists to the wadi.

Monastic history
The desolate region became one of Christianity's most sacred areas. The desert fathers and cenobitic monastic communities used the desert's solitude and privations to develop self-discipline (asceticism). Hermit monks believed that desert life would teach them to eschew the things of this world and follow God's call. Between the 4th and 7th century AD, hundreds of thousands of people from the world over joined the hundreds of Christian monasteries in the Nitrian Desert, centered on Nitria, Kellia and Scetis (Wadi El Natrun).

Saint Macarius of Egypt first came to Scetis (Wadi El Natrun) around 330 AD where he established a solitary monastic site. His reputation attracted a loose band of anchorites, hermits and monks who settled nearby in individual cells. Many of them came from nearby Nitria and Kellia where they had previous experience in solitary desert living; thus the earliest cenobitic communities were a loose consolidation of like-minded monks.  By the end of the fourth century, four distinct communities had developed: Baramus, Macarius, Bishoi and John Kolobos. At first these communities were groupings of cells centered on a communal church and facilities, but enclosed walls and watchtowers developed over time and in response to raids from desert nomads. Nitria, Kellia, and Scellis also experienced internal fractures related to doctrinal disputes in Egypt. At its peak the place contained 700 monasteries. The monasteries flourished during the Muslim conquest of Egypt (639–642), but in the eighth and ninth centuries taxation and administration concerns led to conflicts with the Muslim government.

Invasion of Scetis 
Scetis was attacked by the Mazices who "came sweeping off the Libyan desert" in 407-408 AD and was decimated, causing many notable Desert Fathers to leave the region, such as Abba Anoub. One of the survivors, St. Arsenius the Great, remarked in 410 that, "The world has lost Rome and the monks have lost Scetis." As the Jesuit historian and Professor Willian J. Harmless said, "Scetis’s destruction marked a turning point in the history of early Christian monasticism. The site would be resettled a few years later, and in fact would suffer other raids, notably in 434, 444, and 570."

Nitria and Kellia were eventually abandoned in the 7th and 9th centuries respectively, but Scetis continued throughout the Medieval period. Although some of the individual monasteries were eventually abandoned or destroyed, four have remained in use to the present day:

Monastery of Saint Macarius the Great
Paromeos Monastery
Monastery of Saint Pishoy
Syrian Monastery

Some of the most renowned saints of the region include the various Desert Fathers, including Saint Amun, Saint Arsenius, Saint Isidore of Scété, Saint John the Dwarf, Saint Macarius of Egypt, Saint Macarius of Alexandria, Saint Moses the Black, Saint Pishoy, Sts. Maximos and Domatios, Saint Poimen The Great and Saint Samuel the Confessor.

To this day Wadi El Natrun remains the most important center of Coptic monasticism.

Saint-Exupéry's plane crash 
The environs of Wadi Natrun have been identified as the likely site of where the plane of French 
aviator Antoine de Saint-Exupéry crashed on December 30, 1935.  After miraculously surviving the crash, he and his plane's mechanic nearly died of thirst before being rescued by a nomad. Saint-Exupéry documented his experience in his book Wind, Sand and Stars. The event is thought to have inspired his most famous work, The Little Prince.

Gallery

See also

 Skete
 Door of Prophecies
 Pikrolimni (lake)

References

Further reading
 M. Cappozzo, I monasteri del deserto di Scete, Todi 2009 (Tau Editore).

External links

 The monasteries of the Arab Desert and Wadi Natrun UNESCO World Heritage Centre 1992–2012

Populated places in Beheira Governorate
Coptic settlements
Deserts of Egypt
Coptic Orthodox monasteries in Egypt
Natrun
Natrun
Places associated with hesychasm

Cities in Egypt